Lists of members of China's National People's Congress may refer to:

List of members of the 11th National People's Congress

See also 
 Standing Committee of the National People's Congress

National People's Congress members